Paonidia is a monotypic moth genus in the family Erebidae erected by Edward Meyrick in 1902. Its only species, Paonidia anthracias, was first described by Oswald Bertram Lower in 1897. It is found in New South Wales, Australia.

References

Hypeninae
Monotypic moth genera